The Oklahoma-Azerbaijan National Guard Partnership is one of 25 European partnerships that make-up the U.S. European Command State Partnership Program and one of 88 worldwide partnerships that make-up the National Guard State Partnership Program.

History
 State Partnership was established in 2003
 Armenia–Azerbaijan relations are prominent in Azerbaijan's political and military agenda.
 Azerbaijan seeks to balance relations with neighbors Russia and Iran with that of the US and the West.

Partnership mission
 Emphasis on enabling coalition support.
 Renovation on airfields in Azerbaijan
 Medical University MOUs and Agreements
 Build on established Agriculture University MOUs and current partnerships, USAID and DTRA projects.

Proposed cooperation:
 NATO Interoperability Cooperation
 Hone Agriculture and University Cooperation

References

External links
 The EUCOM State Partnership page for Oklahoma-Azerbaijan
 Department of Defense News on the Oklahoma-Azerbaijan Partnership
 EUCOM SPP
 National Guard Bureau SPP
 National Guard Bureau SPP News Archives

National Guard (United States)
Military alliances involving the United States
Azerbaijan–United States military relations